Søren Jochumsen (born 1 August 1976) is a retired Danish professional football (soccer) player, who played as a goalkeeper. Despite his lack of height, he is known as one of the most reliable goalkeepers of the league.

He played for Torsted IF until 1990, where he moved to FC Horsens. In 1994, FC Horsens became a part of the superstructure AC Horsens, and Jochumsen moved to the new team, where he has played since.

Honours
Danish 1st Division:
Runner-up: 2004-05
Danish 2nd Division:
Runner-up: 1996-97

External links
AC Horsens profile
Career statistics at Danmarks Radio

1976 births
Living people
Danish men's footballers
AC Horsens players
Danish Superliga players
People from Horsens
Association football goalkeepers
Sportspeople from the Central Denmark Region